The French Ice Hockey Hall of Fame, was founded in 2008 by the French Ice Hockey Federation, in the commune of Chamonix, on the occasion of the centenary of the French Championship.  The Hall serves to honor players, coaches, referees, and other individuals who have contributed to the sport of ice hockey in France.

Members

2008

Philippe Bozon
Jean Ferrand
Jacques Lacarrière
Pete Laliberté
Louis Magnus
Chamonix Hockey Club

2009

Albert Hassler 
Daniel Huillier
Henri Lafit
Calixte Pianfetti
Charles Ramsay
Hockey Club de Cergy-Pontoise

2010

Camil Gélinas
Claude Pourtanel
Léon Quaglia
Antoine Richer
Association pour la promotion du hockey

2011

Bernard Deschamps
Philippe Lacarrière
Jean Tarenberque
Christophe Ville
Cercle des patineurs de Paris

2012

Alain Bozon
Albert Fontaine
Angela Lezziero
Marie-Claude Raffoux
Famille Claret

2013

Joseph Cochet
Marcel Guadaloppa
Gilbert Itzicsohn
Jean-Claude Sozzi
Jean Vassieux

2014

Jean Jullien
Charles Libberman
André Peloffy
Patrice Purtanel

2015

Philippe Rey
Christian Pouget
Daniel Maric
Albert Kimmerling
Leo Mounier

2016

André Vuillermet
Louis Smaniotto
Thierry Monier
Jean–Louis Millon
Tristan Alric

2017

Paul Lang
Arnaud Briand
Alain Mazza
Corrin Dogemont

See also
IIHF Hall of Fame

References

External links
French Ice Hockey Hall of Fame (on the French Ice Hockey Federation website)

Ice hockey museums and halls of fame
Ice hockey in France
Hall
Halls of fame in France
2008 establishments in France